Hyde Central railway station is the main station serving Hyde, Greater Manchester, England.

Originally simply Hyde, it was built by the Manchester, Sheffield and Lincolnshire Railway, opening in 1858 as a branch from its main line through Penistone to Sheffield. From 1862, the branch was extended to New Mills to meet the Midland Railway's extension of its line from Millers Dale. For a while, it saw Midlands expresses from London. In 1875, however, a new more direct route was built through Bredbury.

The substantial station buildings were demolished in 1980, with a new booking office at street level commissioned in their place.

Hyde is also served by Hyde North, on the same line as Hyde Central, and by Flowery Field, Newton for Hyde and Godley on the electrified Manchester to Glossop/Hadfield line.

Service

Hyde Central is served by a half-hourly weekday and Saturday service either way between Manchester Piccadilly and Rose Hill Marple. The frequency drops to hourly after 19:00 and there is no service after 22:00. There is no Sunday service.

All trains are diesel multiple units, normally Class 150s or Class 195s, operated by Northern Trains .

In July 2020, Northern informed local residents that services between Manchester and Rose Hill Marple would not operate between early September and mid-December 2020; this was due to the effects of the COVID-19 pandemic on their workforce.  Although disruption occurred, the service was restored soon afterwards.

References

External links

Railway stations in Tameside
DfT Category F1 stations
Former Great Central and Midland Joint Railway stations
Railway stations in Great Britain opened in 1858
Northern franchise railway stations
Hyde, Greater Manchester